Chihiro Ishida (born 20 December 2001) is a Japanese professional footballer who plays as a midfielder for WE League club Nojima Stella Kanagawa Sagamihara.

Club career 
Ishida made her WE League debut on 12 September 2021.

References 

Japanese women's footballers
Living people
2001 births
Women's association football midfielders
Association football people from Tokyo Metropolis
Nojima Stella Kanagawa Sagamihara players
WE League players